This is a list of official symbols of the United States Commonwealth of Massachusetts. Official symbols of the commonwealth are codified in Chapter 2 of the Massachusetts General Laws.

State symbols

United States quarter dollar – Massachusetts 2000:

See also 
 Ense petit placidam sub libertate quietem
 Commonwealth of Massachusetts
 List of Massachusetts-related topics
 List of U.S. state minerals, rocks, stones and gemstones
 Lists of United States state insignia
 Sacred Cod

Notes 
 Chapter 162 of the Acts of 1997: An Act Designating the Song "The Great State of Massachusetts" as the State Glee Club Song
 Chapter 17 of the Acts of 2003: An Act Designating the Bay State Tartan as the Official Tartan of the Commonwealth
 Chapter 407 of the Acts of 2004: An Act Designating the Official Colors of the Commonwealth
 Chapter 19 of the Acts of 2006: An Act Designating Taj Mahal as the Official Blues Artist of the Commonwealth
 Chapter 215 of the Acts of 2006: An Act Designating Basketball as the State Sport

References

External links
General Laws of Massachusetts, Chapter 2: Arms, Great Seal, and Other Emblems of the Commonwealth
Massachusetts State Symbols

State symbols
Massachusetts